Paulo Wandelson Afonso Santana, (born October 28, 1984, in Bengo), is an Angolan professional basketball player.

A  in height, point guard, Santana was named MVP at the 2006-2007 Canadian College Basketball Western Conference season. He also played for his country's national team in the 2004 Summer Olympics, 2006 FIBA World Championship, FIBA Africa Championship 2007.

See also
 Angola national basketball team

References

External links
AfricaBasket Profile
RealGM Profile
SportsOpera Profile
2004-2005 Stats

1984 births
Living people
Acadia Axemen basketball players
African Games bronze medalists for Angola
African Games medalists in basketball
Angolan expatriate basketball people in the United States
Angolan expatriate sportspeople in the Netherlands
Angolan men's basketball players
Atlético Petróleos de Luanda basketball players
Competitors at the 2011 All-Africa Games
Point guards
Southeastern Blackhawks men's basketball players